Aspidoparia is a small genus of cyprinid fishes that are found in South Asia. There are currently two recognized species in this genus.

Species
There are currently two recognized species in this genus. In addition to these, Cabdio morar was formerly included in Aspidoparia.

 Aspidoparia jaya (F. Hamilton, 1822) (Jaya)
 Aspidoparia ukhrulensis Selim & Vishwanath, 2001

References

Danios
Fish of Asia